Elysius pretiosa is a moth of the family Erebidae first described by Peter Jörgensen in 1935. It is found in Paraguay.

References

Moths described in 1935
pretiosa
Fauna of Paraguay
Moths of South America